The 2002 Australian Formula 3 Championship was a CAMS sanctioned national motor racing title for drivers of Racing Cars complying with FIA Formula 3 regulations.
Eligibility was restricted to cars constructed outside of Australia between 1 January 1995 and 31 December 2001.
The title was contested over an eight round series with two races per round.
 Round 1, Adelaide Parklands, South Australia, 15–17 March
 Round 2, Symmons Plains, Tasmania, 5–7 April
 Round 3, Oran Park, New South Wales, 10–12 May
 Round 4, Winton, Victoria, 21–23 June
 Round 5, Wakefield Park, New South Wales, 9–11 August
 Round 6, Sandown, Victoria, 6–8 September
 Round 7, Phillip Island, Victoria, 20–22 September
 Round 8, Gold Coast, Queensland, 24–27 October
Points were awarded on a 20-15-12-10-8-6-4-3-2-1 basis to the first ten finishers in each race with an additional point awarded for both the fastest qualifying time for each race and the fastest lap of each race.
An additional contest, the National Series, was run concurrently with the Australian Formula 3 Championship but was restricted to 
Level 2 cars, i.e. cars constructed within Australia and cars constructed outside of Australia between 1 January 1989 and 31 December 1994.
Points were awarded in the same manner as for the Australian Formula 3 Championship.

Results

References

External links
 Australian Titles Retrieved from CAMS Online Manual of Motor Sport on 30 August 2008
 Race Result Archive Retrieved from Natsoft on 30 August 2008
 Images from the Gold Coast Round Retrieved from The Internet Archive on 30 August 2008

Australian Formula 3 seasons
Formula 3
Australia
Australian Formula 3